Horse Creek is a stream and tributary of the Tombigbee River in southern Marengo County and northern Clarke County in Alabama.

Location and characteristics

Prehistoric period
Archaeological work during the 1980s indicated that Horse Creek may mark the southern boundary for the Miller 1 phase of the Miller culture.

A truncated pyramidal platform mound near the mouth of the creek was briefly investigated by archeologist Clarence Bloomfield Moore on March 5, 1905, during his expedition around the Southern United States aboard his steamboat, the Gopher. Moore thought the mound to be domiciliary, as it was unlike the small rounded burial mounds that are typical of the area.  Due to the scarcity of Mississippian sites in the lower Tombigbee River Valley, Moore tentatively dated it to the Woodland period.

References

Rivers of Alabama
Tributaries of the Tombigbee River
Rivers of Clarke County, Alabama
Rivers of Marengo County, Alabama